() is a 1952 black-and-white Japanese film directed by Hiroshi Inagaki. The film is based on a serialized novel by Yasushi Inoue published in the Sunday Mainichi.

Cast
 Toshiro Mifune
 Kenzo Tabu

Release
Sword for Hire was released in Japan on 22 May 1952 where it was distributed by Toho.

The film was released in the United States on November 15, 1956 by Topaz Film Company with English subtitles and a narration by Bob Booth. The Topaz version was produced by Toho.

References

Footnotes

Sources

External links 
 
  http://www.jmdb.ne.jp/1952/cb001070.htm

Jidaigeki films
Samurai films
Japanese black-and-white films
1952 films
Films directed by Hiroshi Inagaki
Films with screenplays by Akira Kurosawa
Films produced by Tomoyuki Tanaka
Toho films
1950s Japanese films